Brush Point was a community that existed in DeKalb County, Illinois, United States, which is now extinct. In June 1839 it was under consideration as one of three towns, for county seat. It gained the support of Brush Point doctor Henry Madden. Ultimately, Brush Point lost out to Sycamore and disappeared from existence. Brush Point is located in Mayfield Township, northwest of Sycamore and north of DeKalb.

Notes

Ghost towns in Illinois
Populated places in DeKalb County, Illinois